Network SouthEast (NSE), the sector of British Rail which ran passenger services in London and southeast England between 1986 and 1994, operated a wide variety of rolling stock during its existence.  The majority of the network was electrified, and further electrification schemes took place during the 1986–1994 period; and the 7,000 vehicles owned by NSE in 1986 consisted of a mixture of electric, diesel-electric and diesel multiple units, diesel locomotives and the coaches they hauled.

Network SouthEast inherited a large fleet of electric multiple units (EMUs), smaller numbers of diesel (DMU) and diesel electric (DEMU) multiple units, and some diesel locomotives and coaching stock.  Much of the fleet was introduced after the 1955 Modernisation Plan; stock was old (some dated from before World War II) and in variable condition, giving a "drab" and "uninspiring" appearance, and was difficult to convert to driver-only operation.  Accordingly, the sector invested in many new vehicles during its eight-year history. After initial problems, the Networker range of units proved very successful and is still used across southeast England on the privatised rail network.  The same applies to the innovative Class 319 dual-voltage units, built for NSE's new Thameslink service which operated on two incompatible types of electrified line.

Overview

The London & South East Sector (L&SE) was created in 1982 when British Rail underwent the process of sectorisation.  During the four-year life of this sector—Network SouthEast's immediate predecessor—the number of passenger-carrying vehicles allocated to it was reduced steadily as timetables were adapted in response to a decline in demand caused by the recession.   In May 1984 L&SE operated 7,465 vehicles, which was to be reduced to 7,050 by the start of 1986.  The NSE era started in June 1986 when the LS&E sector was rebranded, at which point it owned 7,004 vehicles.  Of these, the great majority (6,080) were EMU coaches: about 68% of the network's 2,000 route mileage was electrified.  There were 489 DMU/DEMU coaches, 57 locomotives and 435 coaches hauled by locomotives.  Public address systems and power-assisted sliding doors were available on 51% and 23% of vehicles respectively, and the fleet had a mean age of 24 years.  NSE's investment in new coaching stock, refurbishment of existing stock and electrification of routes changed all of these figures over the course of the sector's eight-year existence.  By 1990, NSE had nearly 100 more EMU coaches but fewer DMUs and a near-halving of locomotive-hauled stock; and 80% of carriages had a public address system and 33% featured sliding doors.  
By the end of the NSE era in 1994, the sector had acquired 3,020 new coaches and had overhauled a further 2,578.  Refurbishment ranged from the "small but important" work undertaken on the Class 487 Waterloo & City line units, funded by City of London-based firm Allied Lyons, to the £17 million spent on the 1,570-coach Class 423 fleet.  Except for the small fleet of Class 487 units built in 1940 for the Waterloo & City line and some older ex-London Underground stock cascaded to the Island Line on the Isle of Wight, the oldest EMUs were the hundreds of Class 415 and 416 (EPB) units built in the 1950s (the oldest units dated from 1951 and 1950 respectively).  Throughout the LS&E and NSE eras there were more than 800 of these vehicles in service: 139 4-coach Class 415 units and 126 of the 2-coach Class 416s.  Some of the oldest examples had underframes reused from interwar stock.

Network SouthEast's fleet of EMUs featured seven different body designs, from 1930s styles based on stock designed by Oliver Bulleid to the "modernistic but attractive" lightweight aluminium Networker range designed "from the ground up" by NSE's own design team.  Most vehicles were based on British Rail's standardised Mark 1, Mark 2 and Mark 3 carriages, but there were variations in construction materials (welded steel panels, or steel or aluminium bodies of integral construction), door types (slam-doors or automatic sliding doors), underframe styles, cab fronts and internal layouts.  NSE put great emphasis on interior design and the application of its standard livery.  Rolling stock of all types was painted in the network's "house colours" of red, white blue and grey horizontal bands, swept up diagonally at the end of each unit.  Compared to this bold, bright exterior decoration—popularly likened to toothpaste because of its striped pattern—interiors were plainer and more "restful", featuring grey, blue or white plastic panelling, blue seat moquette and fluorescent strip lights.  Most stock had open (saloon-style) seating by the start of the NSE era, but some First Class compartments survived throughout the period.

Most EMUs had one of two incompatible forms of electric traction equipment: 750 volts DC (direct current) or 25,000 volts AC (alternating current).  The Class 313 and 319 units were equipped for both, although only the latter operated journeys which included both systems.  Units equipped for DC traction collected electrical current from a third rail using a collector shoe attached to their bogies, which were in turn connected to traction motors (mostly built in the 1950s, even those used on newer stock).  AC-powered EMUs collected power from overhead lines using a pantograph.  Standard across NSE's fleet were electropneumatic brakes and either semi-automatic Buckeye couplers or (on some later units) fully automatic couplers.

Networker family of trains

Network SouthEast was launched to the public on 10 June 1986 by its director Chris Green.  One of his promises at that time was "a new concept for suburban rail travel around London"—the Networker train.  This would be a family of closely related classes of diesel and electric rolling stock which shared design and engineering features such as lightweight aluminium alloy bodywork (instead of steel), fully automatic couplings, computer-controlled traction motors, passenger-operated sliding doors and new high-backed seating laid out to give more space around the doors.  The diesel version of the train was named the "Network Turbo".

A British Rail research team at Derby Works was developing a concept called the "Advanced Suburban Train" in the mid-1980s, based around innovations such as AC traction motors (smaller, lighter and more reliable than direct current-operated motors) and light aluminium bodies.  After visiting Derby in 1986 and investigating the concept, Green committed to buying large numbers of the trains (to be called "Networkers") for NSE in two stages.  The first batch would be delivered in 1990, then a second batch incorporating extra technical innovations would be bought in 1993.   Until the Networkers were ready, NSE would continue to procure steel-bodied trains to replace ageing stock.

It was decided that the fleet of electric Networkers would replace the entire fleet of ageing slam-door trains on the inner suburban routes of southeast London and Kent. A prototype test train, allocated the TOPS classification Class 457, was built in 1988 and undertook extensive testing from June of that year. The interior design and fittings were comprehensively reviewed and revised at the same time: for example, Network SouthEast arranged with the Job Centre in Dartford to borrow all of its applicants for three days to test the efficiency of embarkation and disembarkation through the newly designed push-button sliding doors. In August 1989 a £690 million contract was signed for the delivery of 842 vehicles and the construction of a maintenance and storage depot at Slade Green near Dartford. The Class 465 and 466 units (the latter identical to the more numerous 465s, but built by Metro Cammell at Washwood Heath) were delivered on 19 December 1991, just before Chris Green left NSE to join the InterCity sector.

Meanwhile, NSE placed smaller orders for Networker variants which could run on other parts of the network. The Class 165 and 166 "Networker Turbo" units—the first of which were delivered in September 1991, before the Class 465 and 466 stock—were diesel units with slightly longer bodies and based on technology used in British Rail's long established Sprinter trains. They were used on the Chiltern Main Line and (from 1992) the Great Western Main Line and its branches, where they proved to be much quicker and more reliable than the old diesel units they replaced. Then 164 dual-voltage Class 365 units were built for – (Fen Line) services and long-distance services in Kent; the last units in these classes entered service just before the end of the NSE era in 1994.

Other Networker-style units were proposed and in some cases mocked up or built as prototypes.  Trains based on the Networker design were intended for the London, Tilbury and Southend line; the planned Heathrow Express and Crossrail routes; the Thameslink route; long-distance non-electrified routes such as the West of England Main Line; and long-distance electrified routes.  Each was allocated a provisional TOPS classification, but none were ever built—although mock-ups of some units were still in public view until 1992.  After the recession of the early 1990s and the announcement that Britain's rail network would be privatised, "the Networker revolution faced sudden death".

Nicknames

Rail enthusiasts, staff and the general public gave nicknames to several types of rolling stock based on their appearance or characteristics. The Class 205 diesel-electric units used on the Marshlink Line and Uckfield Line had a distinctive low-frequency engine noise and were nicknamed "Thumpers". The Class 206 "Tadpole" units associated with the Hastings Line were so called because of their unusual profile: they were built from the driving car of Class 201 units and narrower driving trailers from redundant Class 416 stock. In reference to a British television gameshow 3-2-1 and its anthropomorphic dustbin mascot, Class 321 units were nicknamed "Dusty Bins".

Rolling stock of all ages and types was painted in Network SouthEast's livery, made up of horizontal stripes of its house colours of red, white, blue and grey.  From the solebar upwards, the stripes were grey, white, red, white, blue (the thickest stripe, around the windows and doors), white and red.  Much brighter shades of red and blue, and paler grey paint, were used from late 1987.  "Bright", "brash" and "garish" in contrast to British Rail's sober dark blues and greys, it was nicknamed the "toothpaste" livery.

List of rolling stock
 Stock is shown in ascending order of class number, as assigned by the TOPS classification scheme.
 Some classes of rolling stock used during the NSE era are still in use by the privatised train operating companies which succeeded it.  These are identified by a dagger symbol, bold numbers and coloured backgrounds in the "Class" column.
 Not all images show stock in Network SouthEast livery.
 The "Built" column gives the year in which the first units in this class were built.

See also
 British Rail locomotive and multiple unit numbering and classification
 Slam door trains

Notes

References

Bibliography

 
 
 
 
 
 

British Rail passenger services
British Rail rolling stock